Provincial elections were held in the Pakistani province of Sindh to elect the members of the 12 Provincial Assembly of Sindh on 11 May 2013, alongside nationwide general elections and three other provincial elections in Khyber Pakhtunkhwa, Balochistan and Punjab. The remaining two territories of Pakistan, AJK and Gilgit-Baltistan, were ineligible to vote due to their disputed status.

The Pakistan Peoples Party, led by Syed Qaim Ali Shah, despite losing almost 10% of its vote, returned victorious in this election, losing only one seat overall.

Background
Prior to this election, the Pakistan Peoples Party and Muttahida Qaumi Movement were in a coalition government with each other despite the fact that the PPP had enough seats to be able to form a government by themselves.

Campaign
Overall, the election campaign for the Pakistan Peoples Party was based mainly on garnering support in Sindh, while the Muttahida Qaumi Movement campaign was mainly based in Karachi.

The Pakistan Peoples Party ran on the platform of praising the nationalisation and welfare programs since they took office in 2008, although the Muttahida Qaumi Movement campaigned more on the Muhajir Nationalist side.

Results
Following the elections, the party positions in the assembly remained largely the same, with slight changes. New additions into the assembly included Pakistan Tehreek-e-Insaf, a welfarist, anti-establishment party led by former cricketer Imran Khan, who emerged as the second largest party in Karachi and gained 4 seats. Despite significant drops in the percentage vote share, the change in the assembly composition was not visible, and the Pakistan Peoples Party was able to form a government in Sindh for the ninth time in its existence.

References

2013 elections in Pakistan
2013